Beamtree (formerly Pacific Knowledge Systems) is a health data analytics company based in Sydney, Australia. Tim Kelsey was appointed chief executive in December 2020. Mark Britnell was appointed chair of the Beamtree Global Impact Committee  in August 2021. 

The company recorded a 20% year-on-year growth, and 15% increase in annual recurring revenue in August 2021.

An international division was launched in the UK in 2021. The company acquired Ainsoff Pty Ltd, a clinician-led healthcare analytics company and Potential (x), an Australian firm that provides comparative analytics in 2021.  Ainsoff's founders Dr Levi Bassin and Dr David Bell will join the company.  It has a partnership with the University of Sydney.  The company funds an Associate Professor of Clinical Informatics and Data Science at the University of Sydney.

It formed a partnership with the Central Adelaide Local Health Network to implement the RISQ data quality product across the network of four hospitals. Likewise, it will also support clinical decision-making for pathology services and integrate the Ainsoff Index, which is used to detect deterioration in its early stage, into the electronic medical record.

In March 2022 it set up contracts with four NHS hospital trusts in England to use its RippleDown decision support technology. The combined annual revenue is about £300,000.  It also has a five-year contract with Ampath for the RippleDown software which automates up to 90% of clinical interpretations.

In October 2022 it entered into a partnership to roll out its AI data and decision support products in 450 public and private hospitals in the Kingdom of Saudi Arabia.

References 

Medical technology companies of Australia
Companies based in Sydney